The 2001–02 season was Real Madrid CF's 71st season in La Liga. This article lists all matches that the club played in the 2001–02 season, and also shows statistics of the club's players. Although German home appliance giant Teka appeared as a shirt sponsor earlier in the season, Realmadrid.com replaced it as the primary shirt sponsor later in 2001, and there was no shirt sponsor for the second half of the season. The club introduced new grey and black third kits as well.

Summary
Real Madrid endured its worst domestic league performance under Vicente del Bosque's management, finishing only third in the league standings (with 66 points), as well as losing the Copa del Rey final at the Bernabéu to unheralded Deportivo La Coruña, despite the club's world record signing of Zinedine Zidane from Juventus. On a brighter note, del Bosque delivered La Novena's UEFA Champions League title as a consolation prize, following a 2–1 victory against Bayer Leverkusen in the final thanks to Zidane's volley goal.

First-team squad

Transfers

In

Total spending:  €72,000,000

Out

Total income:  €0

Results

Friendlies

La Liga

League table

Results by round

Matches

Results summary

Copa del Rey

Round of 64

Round of 32

Round of 16

Quarter-finals

Semi-finals

Final

Supercopa de España

Champions League

First group stage

Group A

Second group stage

Group C

Quarter-finals

Semi-finals

Final

FIFA Club World Championship

As winners of the 1999–2000 UEFA Champions League, Real Madrid was one of the 12 teams that were invited to the 2001 FIFA Club World Championship, which was scheduled to be hosted in Spain from 28 July to 12 August 2001. However, the tournament was cancelled, primarily due to the collapse of ISL, which was the marketing partner of FIFA at the time.

Since the fixtures were already released prior to the tournament's cancellation, it is known that Real Madrid would have played its group stage matches at the Bernabéu.

Group stage

Statistics

Appearances and goals

|-
! colspan=14 style=background:#dcdcdc; text-align:center| Players transferred out during the season

Reference:

References

External links
Official site 
Real Madrid team page 
Real Madrid (Spain) profile
UEFA Champions League
Web Oficial de la Liga de Fútbol Profesional
FIFA

Real Madrid
Real Madrid CF seasons
UEFA Champions League-winning seasons